William Whitehill Lindsay (1886 – 1976) was a Scottish footballer who played as an outside left, mainly for Morton where he was a regular in Scottish Division One for seven seasons. During that period the Greenock club usually finished towards the bottom of the league table – they were 17th of 18 teams in 1908–09 and 1909–10, though improved to 6th place in 1911–12.

His younger brother James was also a footballer; the siblings played for Belfast club Glentoran when they won the Irish Cup in 1914 (both scoring in the final), followed by the international Vienna Cup.

References

1886 births
1976 deaths
Date of death missing
People from Johnstone
Footballers from Renfrewshire
People from Bridgeton, Glasgow
Footballers from Glasgow
Scottish footballers
Association football outside forwards
Greenock Morton F.C. players
Glentoran F.C. players
Scottish Football League players
NIFL Premiership players